Palladium on carbon, often referred to as Pd/C, is a form of palladium used as a catalyst. The metal is supported on activated carbon to maximize its surface area and activity.

Uses

Hydrogenation
Palladium on carbon is used for catalytic hydrogenations in organic synthesis. Examples include reductive amination, carbonyl reduction, nitro compound reduction, the reduction of imines and Schiff bases and debenzylation reactions.

Hydrogenolysis
Palladium on carbon is a common catalyst for hydrogenolysis.  Such reactions are helpful in deprotection strategies. Particularly common substrates for hydrogenolysis are benzyl ethers:

Other labile substituents are also susceptible to cleavage by this reagent.

Coupling reactions
Palladium on carbon is also used for coupling reactions. Examples include the Suzuki reaction and Stille reaction.

Preparation
A solution of palladium chloride and hydrochloric acid is combined with aqueous suspension of activated carbon.  The palladium(II) is then reduced by the addition of formaldehyde. Palladium loading is typically between 5% and 10%.  Often the catalyst mixture is stored moist.

See also
Palladium black
Platinum on carbon
Platinum dioxide
Rhodium-platinum oxide
Lindlar catalyst
Raney nickel
Urushibara nickel

References

Palladium
Hydrogenation catalysts